Aloysious Ikem Atuegbu (29 April 1953 – 25 May 2008) was a Nigerian football player.
Nicknamed "Blockbuster" for his ferocious shots, he was a stalwart on the Super Eagles offense from 1975 until 1981, winning 60 caps.

After retirement he got into coaching, including a stint with the Nigeria under-17 national football team.
At his death he was coaching Keffi United FC.

References

External links

https://web.archive.org/web/20100604041417/http://www.supereaglesnation.com/Records.asp
Obituary

1953 births
2008 deaths
Africa Cup of Nations-winning players
Nigerian footballers
Nigeria international footballers
Footballers at the 1980 Summer Olympics
Olympic footballers of Nigeria
1976 African Cup of Nations players
1978 African Cup of Nations players
1980 African Cup of Nations players
Rangers International F.C. players
Mighty Jets F.C. players
Ranchers Bees F.C. players
Association football forwards
Sportspeople from Jos
African Games silver medalists for Nigeria
African Games medalists in football
Competitors at the 1978 All-Africa Games